Dorothy Adlington Cadbury (14 October 1892 – 21 August 1987) was a British botanist and director of confectionery company Cadbury's. She was the oldest child of Dame Geraldine Cadbury and Barrow Cadbury (1867–1957).

She became involved with the International Industrial Relations Institute, serving as its treasurer until Resigning at their second conference in 1928.

Following her retirement from Cadbury's she devoted her time to botany and became an expert on pond weeds. A member of the Botanical Society of the British Isles, in 1950 she joined the Birmingham Natural History Society (BNHS). She was the lead author of A Computer Mapped Flora, the main flora of Warwickshire in the 20th century.

Her name appears on the side of tubs of Cadbury Roses, with the company stating they were named after her favourite flowers, roses, which grew in the gardens of the original factory at Bournville.

References

1892 births
1987 deaths
Botanists active in Europe
British Quakers
People from Warwickshire (before 1974)
Place of birth missing
Place of death missing